Cazcan, or Caxcan (Kaskán), was the language of the Caxcan, one of the Chichimeca peoples of Mexico. It is known only from a few word lists recorded in the 16th and 17th centuries. The language was definitely part of the Uto-Aztecan family, probably related to Huichol or possibly Southern Tepehuan. There appear to have been dialectical differences between the major Caxcan valleys, and it is likely that several other languages were spoken in Caxcan territory.

Among the few words attested are cazcan "there isn't any" (the response to the first Spanish demand for food), yecotl "quemedor", aguano "war chief".

References

Extinct languages of North America
Indigenous languages of Mexico
Languages attested from the 16th century
Languages extinct in the 17th century